Dimension Mix is a compilation album from indie record label Eenie Meenie Records released on August 23, 2005. The CD is a tribute to Dimension 5 Records and the music of electronic sound pioneers Bruce Haack and Esther Nelson.

The album features Eenie Meenie artists such as From Bubblegum to Sky, Oranger, Blue-Eyed Son, and DJ Me DJ You as well as more popular artists such as Beck, Eels, Stereolab, and The Apples in Stereo.

The profits made from the project are donated to Cure Autism Now to "benefit" autistic children. The album was produced by Ross Harris, who has an autistic son.

Track listing
"Funky Little Song" – Beck – 5:15
"Mudra" – Stereolab – 6:44
"I'm Bruce (Dimension 5 Mega Mix)" – Fantastic Plastic Machine – 4:47
"Liza Jane" – The Apples in Stereo – 3:16
"Spiders" – Money Mark – 4:01
"Popcorn" – Tipsy – 2:28
"Jelly Dancers" – EELS – 4:36
"School 4 Robots" – Brother Cleve – 4:14
"Catfish" – Oranger – 3:55
"Walking Eagle" – Anubian Lights – 5:56
"Army Ants in Your Pants" – Irving – 4:18
"Soul Transportation" – DJ Me DJ You – 5:16
"Abracadabra" – From Bubblegum to Sky – 2:02
"Listen" – Chris Kachulis – 2:43
"African Lullaby" – Geoffrey Owen & Mary Christopher – 2:42
"Upside Down" – Blue-Eyed Son – 2:19
"Rain of Earth" – The Stone Throw Singers – 5:13
"Nothing To Do" – Danielson Famile – 2:15

The promo CD given to stores to give away contained samples of the songs on the album, each under a minute, as well as ten additional full-length songs not on the proper album:
"Crooked in the Weird of the Catacombs" - Oranger
"Ear Nose & Throat" - Troubled Hubble
"For Guys' Eyes Only" - Hockey Night
"Beers in Heaven" - Space Needle
"The Falcon" - ULYSSES
"Do I Know You" - PINE*am
"Queen of Verlane"  - The High Water Marks feat. Hilarie Sidney of The Apples in Stereo
"L-O-V-E" - Irving
"Operation Big Beat" - From Bubblegum to Sky
"Sunburn" - Blue-Eyed Son

Personnel
All recordings copyright 2005 Eenie Meenie Records except track 1 (copyright 2004 Interscope Records) and track 7 (copyright 2004 EELS).

Funky Lil' Song
Beck: guitar and vocals
Erik Richards: piano, bass, sitar and drums
Ross Harris: keyboards, percussion, electric banjo and effects
Produced, arranged and recorded by Ross Harris at Burning Trailer Studios
Additional production by Erik Richards at Somis Sounds Studios
Mixed by Josh at Ton Recording Studio, Echo Park
Beck appears courtesy of Interscope Records

Mudra
Remixed by Stereolab

I'm Bruce (Dimension 5 Mega Mix)
Produced by Tomoyuki Tanaka (Fantastic Plastic Machine)
Programmed and mixed by Masayuki Kumahara (Think Sync Integral)
Contains elements from "School 4 Robots" and "Intro" from The Way Out Record; "Army Ants in Your Pants" from Captain Entropy; "Intro", "A Little Discussion" and "A Stuffy Story" from Dance Sing and Listen; and "Fireworks" from Dance Sing and Listen Again.

Liza Jane
Produced and engineered by Robert Schneider

Spiders
All instruments performed by Money Mark
Money Mark appears courtesy of Pinto Records

Popcorn
Remixed by Tipsy

Jelly Dancers
Performed by EELS
Produced by E
Recorded and mixed by Koool G Murder

School 4 Robots
Produced, arranged and performed by Brother Cleve
Recorded at The Rubberoom
Mixed by Ducky Carlisleat Ice Station Zebra, Boston, Massachusetts

Catfish
Performed by Oranger
Recorded by Oranger at Plymouth Sounds, SF (2004)
Little Kid Noises by Patrick Main, Age 8

Walking Eagle
Performed by Anubian Lights
Narration by Lisa Papineau

Army Ants in Your Pants
Performed by Irving: Aaron Burrows, Brian Canning, Alex Church, Steven Scott, Brent Turner
Produced by Elliot Chenault
Engineered and mixed by Mike Stromsoe
Recorded at Egostatic Media

Soul Transportation
David Boria: drums
Erik Richards: bass
Ross Harris: rhythm guitar
Dave Wakefield: lead guitar
Produced and recorded by Craig Berrell and Ross Harris at Burning Trailer Studios
Contains samples of "Soul Transportation" by Bruuce Haack and Esther Nelson

Abracadabra
Performed by From Bubblegum to Sky: Mario Hernandez, Bill Evans, Becky Barron, Frank Jordan

Listen
Performed by Chris Kachulis
Music by Bruce Haack

African Lullaby
Performed by Geoffrey Own and Mary Christopher

Upside Down
Performed by Andrew Heilprin, Koool G Murder, Scott McPherson
Produced, engineered and mixed by Koool G Murder and Andrew Heilprin

Rain of Earth
Gary Wilson: various instrumentation
Peanut Butter Wolf: lead vocals, various instrumentation
Koushik: backup vocals on chorus, melodica
Sa-Ra: vocal harmonies on chorus
Intro by Padraic Mcguire and Koushik for Home Skillet Productions
Produced by PB Wolf and Gary Wilson
Additional vocal production by Sa-Ra Creative Partners
Mixed by Dave Cooley and PB Wolf at Bionic Studios (Echo Park, California)
Sa-Ra appears courtesy of SRCP
Other performers appear courtesy of Stones Throw Records

Nothing to Do
Danielson: acoustic guitar, vocal
Rachel Galloway: flute, vocal
Christiaan Palladine: keys, vocal
Megan Slaboda: bells, vocal
David Smith: drums
Melissa Palladino: violin, vocal
Jon Galaxy: bass
Elin K. Smith: vocal
Glen Galaxy: Saxophone

External links
Official Site
Dimension Mix streaming on Bandcamp
Eenie Meenie Site
Ross Harris Interview

Record label compilation albums
Tribute albums
2005 compilation albums
Electronica compilation albums
Charity albums